Dhanapala Philip Ranil Weerasekera (26 May 1924 – 24 February 2011) was a Ceylonese politician.

A member of the Lanka Sama Samaja Party, he was elected to parliament from the Ratnapura electorate in the July 1960 general elections. He then contested the Dehiowita electorate and won in the 1965 general elections and the 1970 general elections. He contested and lost the 1977 general elections from the Deraniyagala electorate.

Born to P. D. Weerasekara, Mahatmaya of Pelmadulla. He was married to Joyce Eleanor Pinto Jayawardena, they had two daughters.

References

1924 births
2011 deaths
Members of the 5th Parliament of Ceylon
Members of the 6th Parliament of Ceylon
Members of the 7th Parliament of Ceylon
Lanka Sama Samaja Party politicians
Sinhalese politicians